The Tennessee pebblesnail (Somatogyrus currierianus) is a species of very small freshwater snail with an operculum. It is an aquatic gastropod mollusc in the family Hydrobiidae.

Distribution
This species is endemic to the Tennessee River in Madison County, Alabama in the United States. It is a Critically Endangered species, and possibly extinct having not been reported since the river was impounded. Assessment of its conservation status is encumbered by the difficulty in differentiating the various species of Somatogyrus from one another. However no specimens of any Somatogyrus species have been reported in recent surveys.

References

Somatogyrus
Endemic fauna of Alabama
Molluscs of the United States
Critically endangered fauna of the United States
Gastropods described in 1863
Taxonomy articles created by Polbot